The Brown Bears women's basketball team is the intercollegiate women's basketball program representing Brown University. The school competes in the Ivy League in Division I of the National Collegiate Athletic Association (NCAA). The Bears play home basketball games at the Pizzitola Sports Center in Providence, Rhode Island on the university campus.

History
Brown has won 6 Ivy League championships, three of them outright (1984, 1992, 1993) and three shared (1985, 1994, 2006). Twice they have played in a playoff (the league did not have a conference tournament until 2017) to determine the Ivy League bid for the NCAA Tournament, winning 72–62 win over Dartmouth in 1994 and losing 73–62 in 2006 to Dartmouth.

Postseason appearances
The Bears have made the NCAA Division I women's basketball tournament once. They have a record of 0–1.

References

External links